A tigress is a female tiger. 

Tigress or The Tigress may also refer to:

Arts and entertainment
 The Tigress (1922 film), a German silent film
 The Tigress (1927 film), an American silent film
 The Tigress (1992 film), a German film
 Tigress (DC Comics), a number of comic book characters
 Master Tigress, a character in Kung Fu Panda
 Tigress Records, a record label
 Tigress (band), a British Rock band

Ships
 USS Tigress, a number of U.S. Navy ships
 HMS Tigress, a number of Royal Navy ships

Other uses
 Triumph Tigress/BSA Sunbeam, a motor scooter

See also

Tiger (disambiguation)
Tigris, a river
Tygress, the ring name of former WCW Nitro Girl Vanessa Sanchez